Sean Casey (born 5 February 1978) is an Irish rower. He competed in the men's coxless four event at the 2008 Summer Olympics.

References

External links
 

1978 births
Living people
Irish male rowers
Olympic rowers of Ireland
Rowers at the 2008 Summer Olympics
Sportspeople from Cork (city)
21st-century Irish people